St Andrew's Church is in Church Street, Slaidburn, Lancashire, England. It is an active Anglican parish church in the deanery of Bowland, the archdeaconry of Craven, and the Diocese of Leeds. Its benefice is united with that of St George, Dunsop Bridge.  The church is recorded in the National Heritage List for England as a designated Grade I listed building.  It is notable for its "quantity of good early woodwork".

History
St Andrew's dates from the 15th century, with alterations made in the 17th century.  The east wall was rebuilt in 1866.

Architecture
The church is constructed in sandstone, with stone slate roofs.  Its plan consists of a nave and chancel under a continuous roof with a clerestory, north and south aisles, a south porch, and a west tower.  The tower is in five stages.  It has a west doorway, above which is a three-light window.  Over this are two niches, one above the other, with a single-light window between.  The bell openings have two lights, and the parapet is plain.  In the south wall of the church is a blocked priest's door. The east window has five lights.

Inside the church is a five-bay south arcade and a six-bay north arcade, both carried on octagonal piers.  In the south aisle is a piscina.  The pews date from the 17th and 18th centuries, some of them being box pews.  The three-decker pulpit, with its sounding board, is from the 18th century.  There is also a rood screen, dating from the 1630s, or later, and another screen in the south aisle.  The two-manual pipe organ was built in about 1870 by Bevington and Sons.  There is a ring of six bells, all of which were cast at the Whitechapel Bell Foundry, five of them in 1843 by Thomas Mears II, and the sixth in 1927 by Mears and Stainbank.

External features
In the churchyard is a sandstone cross shaft dating probably from the 16th century. the upper part of which is carved.  It is listed at Grade II.  The churchyard also contains the war grave of a Duke of Wellington's Regiment soldier of World War I.

See also

Grade I listed churches in Lancashire
Listed buildings in Slaidburn

References

Church of England church buildings in Lancashire
Anglican Diocese of Leeds
Grade I listed churches in Lancashire
English Gothic architecture in Lancashire
Andrew's, Slaidburn
Forest of Bowland